The following properties in Fall River, Massachusetts are listed on the Registered Historic Places. This is a subset of the National Register of Historic Places listings in Bristol County, Massachusetts.

|}

See also

National Register of Historic Places listings in Bristol County, Massachusetts
List of National Historic Landmarks in Massachusetts

References

 
Fall River
National Register of Historic Places in Fall River, Massachusetts
Fall River, Massachusetts